Camilo Ismael Pontoni Hueche (born 29 January 1995) is a Chilean footballer that currently plays for San Antonio Unido as a midfielder.

External links

Camilo Pontoni at playmakerstats.com (English version of ceroacero.es)

1995 births
Living people
People from Temuco
Chilean people of Mapuche descent 
Mapuche sportspeople
Indigenous sportspeople of the Americas
Chilean footballers
C.D. Huachipato footballers
San Marcos de Arica footballers
Magallanes footballers
Deportes Magallanes footballers
Deportes Iberia footballers
San Antonio Unido footballers
Chilean Primera División players
Primera B de Chile players
Segunda División Profesional de Chile players
Association football midfielders